Evans Glacier is a gently-sloping glacier  long and  wide, draining the southeast slopes of Travnik Buttress eastwards between Rugate Ridge and Poibrene Heights to flow into Vaughan Inlet on the east coast of Graham Land, Antarctica. It was discovered by Sir Hubert Wilkins in an aerial flight, December 20, 1928, and named "Evans Inlet" by him for E.S. Evans of Detroit. A further survey by the Falkland Islands Dependencies Survey in 1955 reported that this low-lying area is not an inlet, but is formed by the lower reaches of Hektoria Glacier and the feature now described.

Further reading 
 Defense Mapping Agency  1992, Sailing Directions (planning Guide) and (enroute) for Antarctica, P 276
 Wolfgang Rack, Dynamic Behavior and Disintegration of the Northern Larsen Ice Shelf, Antarctic Peninsula, Innsbruck, October 2000
  Jane G. Ferrigno, Alison J. Cook, Amy M. Mathie, Richard S. Williams, Jr., Charles Swithinbank, Kevin M. Foley, Adrian J. Fox, Janet W. Thomson, and Jörn Sievers, Coastal-Change and Glaciological Map of the Larsen Ice Shelf Area, Antarctica: 1940–2005, U.S. Geological Survey Geologic Investigations Series Map I–2600–B, 1 map sheet, 28-p. text. 
  Etienne Berthier, Ted A. Scambos, Christopher A. Shuman, Mass loss of Larsen B tributary glaciers (Antarctic Peninsula) unabated since 2002 , GEOPHYSICAL RESEARCH LETTERS, VOL. 39, L13501, doi:10.1029/2012GL051755, 2012

External links 

 Evans Glacier on USGS website
 Evans Glacier on SCAR website
  Evans Glacier on marineregions.org

References 

Glaciers of Oscar II Coast